Chaudhry Muhammad Yasin Sohal is a Pakistani politician who had been a member of the Provincial Assembly of the Punjab from August 2018 till January 2023. Previously, he was a member of the Punjab Assembly from 2008 to May 2018.

Early life and education
He was born on 6 September 1965 in Vehari.

He has a degree of Bachelor of Laws which he obtained from University of the Punjab.

Political career

He was elected to the Provincial Assembly of the Punjab as a candidate of PML-N from Constituency PP-156 (Lahore-XX) in 2008 Pakistani general election. He received 27,873 votes and defeated Malik Asif Jehangir, a candidate of Pakistan Peoples Party.

He was re-elected to the Provincial Assembly of the Punjab as a candidate of PML-N from Constituency PP-156 (Lahore-XX) in 2013 Pakistani general election. He received 48,227 votes and defeated Ahsan Rasheed, a candidate of Pakistan Tehreek-e-Insaf (PTI).

He was re-elected to Provincial Assembly of the Punjab as a candidate of PML-N from Constituency PP-162 (Lahore-XIX) in 2018 Pakistani general election after defeating PTI’s Abdul Aleem Khan.

References

Living people
Punjab MPAs 2013–2018
1965 births
Pakistan Muslim League (N) politicians
Punjab MPAs 2008–2013
Punjab MPAs 2018–2023